Saïd Bouhadja (22 April 1938 – 25 November 2020) was an Algerian politician.

Career
He was a member of the National Liberation Front and was elected as President of the People's National Assembly, serving from 23 May 2017 to 24 October 2018. He was succeeded by Mouad Bouchareb.

During the 2019–20 Algerian protests, Bouhadja withdrew his name from consideration for the 2019 Algerian presidential election.

References

1938 births
2020 deaths
Presidents of the People's National Assembly of Algeria
21st-century Algerian people